The Caledonian Forest is the ancient (old-growth) temperate forest of Scotland. The forest today is a reduced-extent version of the pre-human-settlement forest, existing in several dozen remnant areas. 

The Scots pines of the Caledonian Forest are directly descended from the first pines to arrive in Scotland following the Late Glacial; arriving about 7000 BC. The forest reached its maximum extent about 5000 BC, after which the Scottish climate became wetter and windier. This changed climate reduced the extent of the forest significantly by 2000 BC. From that date, human actions (including the grazing effects of sheep and deer) reduced it to its current extent.

The Scots pines of these remnants are, by definition, directly descended from the first pines to arrive in Scotland following the ice age. These remnants have adapted genetically to different Scottish environments, and as such, are globally unique; their ecological characteristics form an unbroken, 9000-year chain of natural evolution with a distinct variety of soils, vegetation, and animals.

To a great extent the remnants survived on land that was either too steep, too rocky, or too remote to be agriculturally useful. The largest remnants are in Strathspey and Strath Dee on highly acidic, freely drained glacial deposits that are of little value for cultivation and domestic stock. An examination of the earliest maps of Scotland suggests that the extent of the Caledonian Forest remnants has changed little since 1600.

History
Following the last glacial period, trees began to recolonise what is now the British Isles over a land bridge which is now beneath the Strait of Dover. Forests of this type were found all over what is now the island of Great Britain for a few thousand years, before the climate began to slowly warm in the Atlantic period, and the temperate coniferous forests began retreating north into the Scottish Highlands, the last remaining climatic region suitable for them in the British Isles (see Climate of Scotland).

The native pinewoods that formed this westernmost outpost of the taiga of post-glacial Europe are estimated to have covered  as a vast wilderness of Scots pine, birch, rowan, aspen, juniper, oak and a few other hardy species. On the west coast, oak and birch predominated in a temperate rainforest ecosystem rich in ferns, mosses and lichens.

Etymology

The name comes from Pliny the Elder who reveals that 30 years after the Roman invasion of Britain their knowledge of it did not extend beyond the neighbourhood of silva caledonia. He gives no information about where the silva caledonia was, but the known extent of the Roman occupation suggest that it was north of the River Clyde and west of the River Tay.

Legend and folklore
In the Matter of Britain, the forest is the site of one of King Arthur's Twelve Battles, according to the Historia Brittonum, in which the battle is called Cat Coit Celidon. Scholars Rachel Bromwich and Marged Haycock suggest that the army of trees animated by sorcerers in the Old Welsh poem Cad Goddeu ("Battle of the Trees") are intended to be the Caledonian Forest.

In related Merlin literature, the figure of Myrddin Wyllt retreated to these woods in his madness after the Battle of Arfderydd in the year 573. He fled from the alleged wrath of the king of Strathclyde, Rhydderch Hael, after the slaying of Gwenddoleu ap Ceidio. This is written in the two Merlinic poems in Middle Welsh Yr Oinau and Yr Afallenau in the Black Book of Carmarthen. The forest is also the retreat of another character named Lailoken from the Vita Kentigerni, who also fled into the woods in a fit of madness and who may be the original model for Myrddin Wyllt.

In the Middle Welsh story Culhwch and Olwen, the main character Culhwch is the son of a king named Celyddon Wledig, who may or may not be related to the forest in name. Another figure from the same story, Cyledyr Wyllt hints at a close relationship of the forest being a retreat for people who suffered from a special kind of madness or gwyllt (Irish geilt). In line 994 to 996 of the story, it is briefly explained, "a Chyledyr Wyllt y uab, a llad Nwython a oruc a diot y gallon, a chymhell yssu callon y dat, ac am hynny yd aeth Kyledyr yg gwyllt." ("and his son Kyledyr the Wild. Gwynn killed Nwython and cut out his heart, and forced Kyledyr to eat his father's heart, and that is how Kyledyr went mad"). Though not named directly, the very name Kyledyr Wyllt is close to the two related notions of the forest of Celyddon being where people suffering madness or gwyllt hide.

Wildlife

Being a unique ecosystem in the British Isles, the Caledonian Pinewoods are home to some of the islands' rarest wildlife. It is considered to be one of the last remaining wildernesses in the British Isles.

Breeding bird species in Caledonian pine forests found breeding nowhere else in the British Isles:
 Western capercaillie
 Common goldeneye
 Crested tit
 Parrot crossbill
 Scottish crossbill

Breeding bird species in Caledonian pine forests rare elsewhere in the British Isles:
 Black grouse
 Red crossbill
 Goosander
 Siskin
 Redpoll
 Long-eared owl
 Osprey
 Red-breasted merganser
 Redwing
 Temminck's stint
 Wood sandpiper
 Horned grebe
 Golden eagle

Mammal species present in Caledonian pine forests:

 Eurasian beaver Reintroduced from escaped farm boar in the late 20th century.
 Wild boar. Reintroduced in the 2000s or earlier.
 Feral goat
 Mountain hare
 European pine marten
 Red deer
 Red fox
 Red squirrel
 Roe deer
 European wildcat

Mammal species extinct in Caledonian pine forests:
 Aurochs
 Brown bear
 Eurasian lynx
 Grey wolf
 Eurasian elk (Called moose in North American English)
 Tarpan (wild horse)

Conservation
A review of the native pinewoods of Scotland Steven & Carlisle (1959) highlighted the plight of the remaining 35 ancient pinewood sites, many of which had been damaged by felling, fire and intensive grazing from sheep and deer. A later review in the 1980s showed that further damage had occurred through ploughing and planting with non-native conifers with less than 12,000 ha of the ancient habitat remaining.  A subsequent guide to the ancient pinewoods reviews the conservation story and provides a summary of the management in each site as well as a guide on how to reach all the woods using public transport, walking, and cycling. Much of the remaining Caledonian pine forest is fully protected with most of the forest lying within the Cairngorms National Park. The Royal Society for the Protection of Birds (RSPB) and Forestry and Land Scotland also own several areas of pinewood on their reserves. One of the largest remaining areas is Ballochbuie Forest on the Balmoral Estate, which is protected as a Special Area of Conservation under the European Union Habitats Directive.

Scientific research continues on the ecology of the Caledonian Forest and its restoration.  Populations of the rare groundcover, Linnaea borealis, may be too isolated from one another to produce viable seed.  Diversity of fungi has also been affected by the decrease in habitat. The agaric fungus Mycena purpureofusca is commonly found in Caledonian pine woods, and it is considered an indicator species for that habitat type. Fire appears to increase the natural recruitment of Scots pine seedlings.

Regeneration
The charity Trees for Life (Scotland) has been working to conserve the remaining forest, and reforest areas where it has been lost, using fences to prevent deer from eating saplings. This involves the reintroduction of the full range of native flora, including mycorrhizal fungi that assist soil regeneration.

Reintroductions
In recent years, there has been a growing interest to reintroduce animals which are native to but currently extinct in Great Britain, back into Caledonian pine forests. Corporations have been set up to persuade the government to allow this. The long-running campaign to reintroduce the Eurasian beaver to Knapdale in Argyll has been successful, and there is some support for the reintroduction of the grey wolf and Eurasian lynx.

Recently, some landowners have announced plans to build large game reserves on their land and release the species within them. Paul Lister plans to release Eurasian lynx, brown bear, grey wolf, elk, wild boar and species already present in Scotland into a huge  enclosure at his estate, Alladale Wilderness Reserve, although releasing top predators such as wolves and bears has become a difficult proposition with local and national regulations.

Remaining pinewoods
Bain (2013) lists 38 ancient pinewood sites in Britain which have been identified as the most genuinely native and natural. All of them occur in the Scottish Highlands. The Caledonian Pinewood Inventory breaks these down into 84 smaller sub-units of the main sites. In March 2019, as part of the implementation of the Forestry and Land Management (Scotland) Act 2018, the Scottish Government listed 84 sites as Caledonian pinewood in regulations, given below.

References

External links

Reforesting Scotland
Native Woodlands - Scottish Forestry
Scotland's Trees, Woods and Forests
Caledonia dreaming, Published: January 2011
History and ancient woodlands of Scotland, Expanding Scotland's woods and forests
The Central Scotland Forest
Trees native to Scotland 
Trees for Life Site
Cairngorms National Park Site
Highland Native Wildlife Park Site
RSPB Abernethy Forest Reserve Site

Nature conservation in Scotland
Ecoregions of the United Kingdom
Forests and woodlands of Scotland
Locations associated with Arthurian legend
Montane forests
Palearctic ecoregions
Rural Scotland
Temperate coniferous forests
Temperate rainforests